The 1942 New Zealand rugby league season was the 35th season of rugby league in New Zealand.

International competitions

New Zealand played in no international matches due to World War II.

National competitions

Northern Union Cup
West Coast again held the Northern Union Cup at the end of the season.

Inter-district competition

Club competitions

Auckland

Manukau won the Auckland Rugby League's Fox Memorial Trophy and Stormont Shield. The Rukutai Shield was won by City-Otahuhu. Richmond won the Roope Rooster.

Due to the World War; Marist and Northcote amalgamated as did Mount Albert and Newton and City and Otahuhu.

Wellington
Miramar won the Wellington Rugby League's Appleton Shield.

Canterbury
Hornby-Rakaia-Riccarton won the Canterbury Rugby League's Massetti Cup.

The competition consisted of; Brigade A, Brigade B, Battery, Canterbury Regiment, A.S.C, Addington, Linwood-Woolston and Hornby-Rakaia-Riccarton.

Other Competitions
Blackball defeated Hornby-Rakaia-Riccarton 21-8 to retain the Thacker Shield.

References

Rugby league season